Worachai Surinsirirat (born March 26, 1973) is a Thai retired footballer and football coach.

Worachai has also played for lower level clubside Raj-Vithi.

Honours
(All honours achieved with BEC Tero Sasana)

Thailand premier League: 2000, 2001/02
Thailand FA Cup: 2000
Kor Royal Cup: 2001/02, Runner Up 2002/03, 2004/05
Runner-up AFC Champions League: 2002/03
Bhutan Kings Cup: 2002, 2004
Brunei Cup: Runner Up 2001/02

References
National Team Players

1973 births
Living people
Worachai Surinsirirat
Worachai Surinsirirat
Raj-Vithi F.C. players
BBCU F.C. players
2004 AFC Asian Cup players
Association football midfielders
Worachai Surinsirirat
Worachai Surinsirirat
sisaket F.C. managers